Christopher Hughes Gambol (born September 14, 1964)  is a former American football offensive lineman who played three seasons in the National Football League (NFL) with the Indianapolis Colts, San Diego Chargers, Detroit Lions and New England Patriots. He was drafted by the Colts in the third round of the 1987 NFL Draft. He played college football at the University of Iowa and attended Oxford High School in Oxford, Michigan.

References

External links
Just Sports Stats
New England Patriots bio

1964 births
Living people
Players of American football from Pittsburgh
American football offensive linemen
Iowa Hawkeyes football players
Indianapolis Colts players
San Diego Chargers players
Detroit Lions players
New England Patriots players